The University of London Screen Studies Group (SSG) is a research consortium in film studies, founded in 2001. Member institutions include Goldsmiths, Birkbeck, University College London, King's College London, Royal Holloway, SOAS, Queen Mary, and  the London School of Economics.

Sources 

Film criticism
Film theory
University of London
Film organisations in the United Kingdom